Nick Sanders may refer to:

 Nick Sanders (Nicholas Mark Sanders, born 1958), British bicyclist, motorcyclist and author
 Nick Sanders (swimmer) (Nicholas James Sanders, born 1971), New Zealand swimmer
 Nick Sanders (musician), American jazz pianist and composer

See also 
 Nicholas Sanders (c. 1530–1581), English Catholic priest and polemicist